Levenhookia chippendalei is a dicotyledonous plant that belongs to the genus Levenhookia (family Stylidiaceae). It is named after its discoverer, George Chippendale, founder of the Northern Territory Herbarium. The inflorescences are racemose. The sensitive labellum is hood-like and dark red with yellow appendages. L. chippendalei is most closely related to L. preissii but differs in flower morphology. It shares a similar floral arrangement with Levenhookia stipitata.

L. chippendalei is the only species in the genus to be recorded from the Northern Territory. It has also been recorded from many locations in Western Australia and given a status of "not threatened" by FloraBase because of that wide abundance.

References

Eudicots of Western Australia
Flora of the Northern Territory
chippendalei